Alka Nupur is a former Indian actress who was best known for her contributions to Hindi cinema throughout the 1980s. She appeared in many films throughout her career, including Laawaris (1981), Brij Bhoomi (1982), John Jani Janardhan (1984), and Mohabbat Ke Dushman (1988).

Career 

In her early years, Nupur first began her career as a Kathak dancer. She had also been taught by Birju Maharaj and Rani Karnaa,  professional dancers. She received Government's National Cultural Scholarship at the age of 21. Throughout her career, she would sometimes be credited as "Alka Noopur", "Alka Napoor" (in Mr. X) and "Alka Kapoor" (in Yaadon Ki Kasam).

She made her first appearance in films with Ek Aur Suhagan in 1979, and then went to make guest appearances in films such as Chashme Buddoor (1 minute's appearance). In 1981, she made an uncredited appearance dancing in Laawaris for "Apni To Jaise Taise." She gained fame for her dancing as the song and movie were hits.
In 1982, she had her first starring role in Brij Bhoomi as Radha. Following this, she went and starred in other films such as Purana Mandir and John Jani Janardhan.

She made more guest and side appearances in films like Zakhmi Sher, and also starred as Chitkari in Pataal Bhairavi.

In 1988, she starred in a major role as Amina Bai in Mohabbat Ke Dushman. She had starred as another main role in Chintamani Surdas.

In the final years of her career, she was cast in Jaadugar, and appeared in Mil Gayee Manzil Mujhe as Sonia, which was her last film before she retired from the film industry.

Her major association was with music director, lyricist and singer Ravindra Jain. Both of them belonged to the same city. Together they did 6 films:- Brajbhoomi, Mr. X, Mhara Peehar Sasra, Harishchandra Shaibya, Jai Karoli Maa and Chintamani Surdas.

Presently, she is married to Banwari Lal Varshney and runs Noopur Centre of Performing Arts in Gurgaon which is affiliated to IGNOU where CPABN(Certificate of Performing Arts-Bharatnatyam) and CPAKT(Certificate of Performing Arts-Kathak) courses are taught. She lives in Delhi. She was awarded 'Braj Ratn' award in 2016.

Filmography

References

External links 

 

20th-century Indian actresses
Indian film actresses
Living people
People from Aligarh
1957 births